K13AV-D, VHF digital channel 13, is a low-power television station licensed to Gunnison, Colorado, United States. The station is owned by the Gunnison County Metropolitan Recreation District.

Translators 
In addition to its principal transmitter at Tenderfoot Mountain, Colorado, in order to broaden its signal coverage area, the station's programming is rebroadcast over a series of translators/satellites to provide over-the-air television service to other areas in and around the Gunnison area and surrounding communities in much of Gunnison and northern Saguache counties. The following is a list of those translators, physical (RF channels) listed.
K30EJ-D/30-Crested Butte 
K33KJ-D/33-Crested Butte 
K05JT/5-Pitkin 
K07VH/7-Sargents 
K24NM-D/24-Sargents
K16DR-D/16-Jacks Cabin  
K36GQ-D/36-Parlin 
K07ZG-D/7-Powderhorn Valley

Subchannels 
The station's signal is multiplexed. One of its subchannels serves as a translator of Fox affiliate KDVR in Denver, using major channel 31.

References

External links
Gunnison Met Rec Service Plan, TV and Radio Service, channel guide

 

Gunnison County, Colorado
13AV-D
This TV affiliates
Independent television stations in the United States
Low-power television stations in the United States